Szalowa  is a village in the administrative district of Gmina Łużna, within Gorlice County, Lesser Poland Voivodeship, in southern Poland.

The village has a population of 2,468.

The main church, St. Michael's, a wooden church built in the 18th century, is on the National Historic registry.

References

Villages in Gorlice County